Columbus High School (CHS) is a public high school located in Columbus, Georgia, United States. It serves as one of the Muscogee County School District's liberal arts magnet schools. It opened in 1890.

In 2018, the school ranked second in the state of Georgia, 105th in the nation, and 21st among magnet schools in the nation by U.S. News & World Report.

History
Columbus High School began in 1890 at a building known as the Female Academy located at 10th Street and 2nd Avenue in downtown Columbus, Georgia. There were 20 students in the first graduating class in 1892, 3 boys and 17 girls. In 1898, the school moved to its first exclusive building (a two-story, red brick structure) at 11th Street and 4th Avenue and remained at that location until 1927. By that time, the graduating class had grown to a total of 90 students (28 boys and 62 girls). In the early 1900s, three alternative educational tracts were offered at CHS, college preparatory, classical and scientific.  In 1913, the first COHISCAN, the CHS annual yearbook, was published. The name is derived from COlumbus HIgh SChool ANnual.

In 1919, the school supported athletic teams including girls’ basketball team and boys’ football and basketball.  In 1923, the “Blue Devil” name was first used when General John J. Pershing referred to a spirited football team playing against Phillips High School in Birmingham, Alabama.  He stated that the team played like devils in winning the game. Previous to that time, several nicknames had been used for CHS sports teams, one of them was “Orange Avalanche.”

In 1924, a bond referendum was approved to build a new high school. The 11th street location had become too small to accommodate the growing population of the city, especially after Camp Benning (now Fort Benning) brought an influx of new people to Columbus during and following World War I.  Sixteen acres in Wildwood Park was selected as the site for the new location for Columbus High School. The respected New York Architectural firm of Starrett and van Vleck, working with local architects, designed the building and the surrounding area. The cornerstone was laid on September 2, 1925 at 1600 Cherokee Avenue and the dedication ceremony was held on September 16, 1926. The first graduating class from the new high school was in 1928. On June 12, 1981, the building was burned and it was later determined to be the result of arson; however, no one was ever arrested.  The fire began where the school records were stored and much of the early records of CHS were destroyed. The school was rebuilt, and on August 27, 1983, a re-dedication ceremony was held for the reconstructed building.

In 2001, CHS became a total magnet school and continues as such today.

In school years 2004-2005, CHS was named a Georgia School of Excellence and a National Blue Ribbon School and has been awarded gold status each year since as one of the best high schools in Georgia and the nation.  In 2017, CHS shared the ranking as the top (#1) high school in the state of Georgia, #21 nationwide for magnet high schools, and #83 nationwide in overall high schools by U.S. News & World Report.

Statistics/Rankings

Columbus High School's overall performance is higher than 99% of schools in the state of Georgia, its academic growth is higher than 94% of schools in the state, and its four-year graduation rate is 99.6%, which is higher than 99% of high schools in the state of Georgia.  CHS students have a college readiness index of 85.8%, with Mathematics and English proficiencies at 88 and 84 percents, respectively - more than twice the state average.

In 2017, CHS was ranked #4 in the state of Georgia for "Best Teachers".

In 2018, CHS ranked third in the state of Georgia, 105th in the nation, and 21st among magnet schools in the nation by U.S. News & World Report.

CHS' student body makeup is 40% male and 60% female, and the total minority enrollment is 42%.

Graduation requirements
All Liberal Arts College Preparatory Magnet students entering the program as 9th graders must earn a total of 32 Carnegie units. To stay in the magnet program, a student must maintain at least a "C" average in any taken course. Failure to do so can result in the removal of the student from Columbus High School, the one exception being for freshmen who fail during their first semester, as the transition to high school may be overwhelming. Students take one core course each year in English, math, science, and social studies.

Community involvement
Each year, freshmen, sophomores, and juniors complete 20 hours of community service with a local non-profit organization. Seniors obtain hours through a Senior Project or AP Research Project. The senior project requires students to pick an activity they have never tried before, work 50 hours alongside a mentor, and maintain a portfolio documenting their progress from the summer before senior year up until the final presentation at Board's Night (usually in April) when they present their project to a panel of judges.

Eligibility
Students qualify for entrance into the program based on:
 8th-grade course averages of 82 or better, with the exception of algebra and foreign languages
 Recommendations from middle school counselor, math, and English teachers
 Entrance exams performance in math, reading, and composition
 Students must maintain a "C" average in each academic course, with the exception of one "F" allowed in the first semester of freshman year.

Location
The school sits atop a hill in the Lakebottom area of the city and across Cherokee Avenue from Lakebottom/Weracoba Park, where the school shares athletic facilities with the Columbus Parks and Recreation Department.

Discipline
Students are required to wear ID cards around their necks at all times during school hours. This serves as the students' library card and can only be removed at the end of the day once off of school property.

Activities
Students can spend their time out of class in the following extracurricular activities.

Athletics
Columbus High School is ranked fourth (2004) in AAAA schools in Georgia. The school is rated 5A by student population. Two-thirds of the students participate in 41 teams:
Boys'/girls' cross country
Boys'/girls' track
Boys'/girls' basketball
Boys'/girls' tennis
Boys'/girls' golf
Boys'/girls' soccer
Baseball
Football
Marching Band - Drumline/Colorguard
JROTC Drill Team
JROTC Colorguard
JROTC Raiders
Swim team
Softball
Cheerleading (competition, football, and basketball)
Wrestling
Rifle Team
Girls' volleyball
Girls' lacrosse

GHSA Class AAAA State Champions
Baseball  - 1984, 1991, 1992, 1994, 1995, 1996, 2000, 2004, 2005, 2010, 2011, 2012
Girls' Basketball - 2017
Cheerleading - 2008, 2010
Boys' Cross country - 1999
Girls' Cross country - 2008, 2010 
Boys' Golf - 1945, 1946, 1947, 1948, 1955, 1958, 1967, 1972, 2010, 2011, 2016, 2018
Girls' Golf - 1999, 2000, 2001, 2002, 2003, 2005, 2006, 2014, 2017
Literary - 2010, 2014, 2015, 2016, 2017, 2018
One Act Competition - 2003, 2006, 2007, 2012, 2016, 2018 
Softball - 2009
Boys' Tennis - 2013
Girls' Tennis - 2016
Boys' Track - 1967
Volleyball - 2007, 2013, 2015
Wrestling - 2006

Fine arts
The program includes chorus, drama, band, and orchestra. At CHS the drama department or "Full House Productions" usually produces a one-act show that is used to compete in a local competition, and a spring musical. In the theater department the two acting classes also each produce their own class showcase in the form of a play.

Clubs and organizations
Clubs and organizations at CHS include Future Physicians of America; Equestrian Club; Junior Civitan; Ballroom Dance Club; Art Club/National Art Honor Society; National Honor Society; Beta Club; Students Against Destructive Decisions; Language Clubs: Spanish, Japanese, French, Latin; DREAMS (Doing Research at Extreme Altitude by Motivated Students); FIRST Robotics Competition; Science Club; Science Olympiad; Student to Student (S2S); Competition Mathematics Team; Academic Decathlon; Thespians Drama Society; Marching Band; Dance Team; Model United Nations; Debate; Student Council; Chess Club; Debate; Mock Trial; Orchestra; and Future Business Leaders of America.

Publications
The school annual is written by students as part of a yearbook class. It title is the COHISCAN (Columbus HIgh SChool ANnual).

Notable alumni

 Reggie Abercrombie, Major League professional baseball player
 Dan Amos, class of 1969, Chairman and CEO of AFLAC
 Essang Bassey, Wake Forest cornerback
 James Ryan Haywood, Voice Actor and Member of Online Entertainment Group Achievement Hunter.
 Garey Ingram, Major League professional baseball player, current AA hitting coach for the Mississippi Braves
 Nunnally Johnson, class of 1915, screenwriter and filmmaker
 Charity Lawson, class of 2014, star of season 20 of The Bachelorette
 Carson McCullers, class of 1933, writer
 John McNally, class of 1974, distinguished pistol marksman, member of the 1984, 88, 92, 96 and 2000 Olympic teams (international rapid fire pistol event)
 Sam Mitchell, NBA player and head coach
 Skeeter Newsome, former professional baseball player (Philadelphia Athletics, Boston Red Sox, Philadelphia Phillies)
 Ketia Swanier, WNBA basketball player (Phoenix Mercury)
 Frank Thomas, class of 1986, Major League professional baseball player Inducted into Baseball Hall of Fame in 2014.

References

External links
 Columbus High School website
 Columbus High baseball
 Columbus High men's soccer

Magnet schools in Georgia (U.S. state)
Educational institutions established in 1890
High schools in Columbus, Georgia
Public high schools in Georgia (U.S. state)
1890 establishments in Georgia (U.S. state)